Mohammad Amin may refer to:

 Mohammad Amin (historian) (1928–2012), Indian historian
 Mohammad Amin (cricketer, born 1920), Pakistani cricketer
 Mohammad Amin (Kuwaiti cricketer) (born 1987), Kuwaiti cricketer
 Mohammad Amin (politician), Bangladesh Awami League politician
 Mohammad Ruhul Amin (1934–1971), Bangladesh Navy sailor

See also
 Mohammed Amin (politician) (1928–2018), Indian politician
 Mohammed Amin (boxer) (1913–?), Egyptian boxer
 Mohammed Amin (businessman), British Muslim businessman
 Mohamed Amin (1943–1996), Kenyan photojournalist
 Mohamed Amin Didi (1910–1954), Maldivian politician
 Mohammed Amyn (born 1976), Moroccan long-distance runner